Srpouhi Dussap (Armenian: Սրբուհի Տիւսաբ; 1840–1901) was an Armenian feminist writer and the first female Armenian novelist. She was the sister of famed Ottoman Armenian politician Hovhannes Vahanian.

Biography 
Dussap was born as Srpouhi Vahanian in the Ortakoy district of Constantinople to a prosperous upper-class Armenian Catholic family. At the time, wealthy families regularly imitated the trends and customs of Western European, primarily French society. The young Dussap, being educated in Western European institutions, showed little interest in the Armenian language. However, after being tutored by the Armenian poet Mkrtich Beshiktashlian, Dussap began to show a deep affection for the language as well as her heritage. Her first creative writing attempts were written in classical Armenian.

Dussap was married to a French musician, Paul Dussap, with whom she ran a European style salon where the city's prominent intellectuals, liberals, writers and activists would gather to discuss social and political issues, literature and poetry. She was active in philanthropic and charitable organizations that furthered the support and education of women.  Dussap's oeuvre reflects nineteenth century European trends. She wrote mainly in the Romantic style.

Dussap had two children, Dorine and Edgar.  Dorine died in 1891, after which Dussap ceased writing for publication. Dussap died in 1901.

Writings
Dussap is the first Armenian writer who published works that today would be called feminist.  The earliest of these were a series of essays on the status of women's education and employment.  In 1883, she published the first novel by an Armenian woman, Mayda, which treated the theme of women's unequal status.  Dussap's concern with female subordination, inferior education, and lack of financial independence was developed in the later novels Siranush (1884) and Araksia, or The Governess, (1887). 
 
She was very much concerned about the situation of the female peasantry of the Ottoman Empire, attacking the traditional patriarchal structures behind their ignorance, and the male oppression that led to forced marriages in the countryside. She further noted that even in the more cultured and cosmopolitan Constantinople, women "were still deprived of their freedom and dominated by men." Dussap was certain that society would not be able to advance without the emancipation of women. For these liberal ideas, she faced resentment from some prominent Armenian intellectuals, such as Krikor Zohrab, but was esteemed by progressivists.

Legacy

Dussap is regarded today as a pioneer in addressing female inequality and the need for female education. She was an inspiration to other Armenian women writers and journalists such as Zabel Yesayan, who recalled reading her in her youth, "We used to read Madame Dussap's books together, and in the work of that feminist author, we tried to find solutions to the problems we faced." Later, she and her friends visited Dussap: "She immediately started asking questions and spoke to us with warmth and encouragement...Hearing that I hoped to become a writer, Madame Dussap tried to warn me.  She said that, for women, the world of literature was full of many more thorns than laurels.  She told me that in our day and age, a woman who wanted to carve out a place for herself in society was still not tolerated.  To overcome all of these obstacles, I needed to exceed mediocrity. ..She made a deep impression on us...We both agreed that in order to exceed mediocrity, we needed to go to Europe to continue our education."

The first English translation of her novel Mayda, by Nareg Seferian, was published in 2020.

References

Bibliography
Translated from Armenian: Արդի հայ գրականութիւն [Modern Armenian Literature], Beirut, 1943, pp. 134–138

External links 
 Book Review: Echoes of Protest in ‘Mayda’ by Srpuhi Dussap 

1840 births
1901 deaths
Turkish feminists
Armenian feminists
Salon-holders from the Ottoman Empire
19th-century writers from the Ottoman Empire
Armenian-language writers
Feminist artists
Armenians from the Ottoman Empire
Writers from Istanbul
Date of birth missing
Date of death missing
Place of death missing